S-(2-Aminoethyl)isothiourea dihydrobromide, commonly knwn as AET, is a isothiouronium-group-containing reducing agent with textbook uses as a disulfide reducing agent. Though it does not have a free thiol group (-SH) like 2-mercaptoethanol and dithiothreitol (DTT), it reacts with water to decompose transiently into thiol intermediates that acts on disulfide in a manner to these containing free -SH groups.

Applications
One application of AET is in hematology where red cells are treated with AET to create PNH-like cells.

References

Reducing agents
Thioureas